This was the first edition of the tournament.

Emina Bektas and Tara Moore won the title, defeating Olga Govortsova and Jovana Jović in the final, 5–7, 6–2, [10–8].

Seeds

Draw

Draw

References
Main Draw

Georgia's Rome Tennis Open - Doubles